The Arkansas Christian College Administration Building is a former school building at 100 West Harding Street in Morrilton, Arkansas.  It is a two-story masonry structure with Colonial Revival features, built in 1919-20 for the newly founded Arkansas Christian College.  The college was the second higher education facility in Morrilton, and was an important part of the city's early 20th-century educational history.  The school merged with Harper College in 1924 to become Harding College, and moved to Searcy, Arkansas in 1934.  The building, the only surviving element of the school's Morrilton history, is now home to the Southern Christian Home, a charity that places needy children.

The building was listed on the National Register of Historic Places in 2014.

See also
National Register of Historic Places listings in Conway County, Arkansas

References

University and college buildings on the National Register of Historic Places in Arkansas
Buildings and structures in Morrilton, Arkansas
National Register of Historic Places in Conway County, Arkansas
School buildings completed in 1920
Colonial Revival architecture in Arkansas
1920 establishments in Arkansas